The A2 Highway (also known as the R4 Highway) is a primary road in Zimbabwe running from Harare to Nyamapanda at the border with Mozambique. The Mozambican side border post is called Cochemane. This is a busy entry point used by people travelling by road between South Africa, Malawi, Zimbabwe and Mozambique.
It starts at intersection with Samora Machel Avenue; however Enterprise Road itself begins from the T-junction with Robert Mugabe Avenue, opposite the market in Eastlea, east of Simon Muzenda Street (Fourth Street) Road Port; a bus terminus for inter-regional buses.

The A2 Highway proper begins where Enterprise Road makes a Y junction sending out A13 Highway to the left hand side and the A2 Highway to the right or straight ahead.  and it ends right at the border with Mozambique.

Background

The 238 km long A2 Highway is popularly known as Mutoko Road and sometimes called Nyamapanda Road.

The A2 Highway was constructed in 1980. Before 1980 the road was partly gravel towards Nyamapanda. Is one of the narrow highways in Zimbabwe. The road is part of the regional trunk road network linking Zimbabwe to the rest of the SADC and COMESA regions through Mozambique.

Operations

The A2 Highway known as Mutoko Road, Mutoko being popular as a mango and tomato supplier to Mbare Musika the largest green market in Harare and all Zimbabwe.

The border post known as the “Nyamapande Customs Post” is located close to the town of Nyamapanda in Mashonaland East Province. The town itself was named after the Nyamapanda River. The Mozambican side is called Cochemane. In Mozambique the A2/R4 becomes Route 103 to Tete en route to Malawi.

Regional Road Corridor

As a regional corridor the A2 is known as the R4 Highway relays traffic from South Africa to Malawi. 
From Harare to Lilongwe using the A2/R4 Highway and Mozambique's Route 222 the distance is about 741 km (460.4 miles).

This is SADC Route 25 from Durban to Tanzania via Zimbabwe, Mozambique and Malawi and in Zimbabwe the corridor is 812 km long.

 N1 Highway from Gauteng Province to Beitbridge border with Zimbabwe.
 R1/A4 takes from Beitbridge to Harare.
 Then the   R4/A2 takes from Harare to Nyamapanda border with Mozambique
 From Nyamapanda the highway follows Route 103 to Mwanza (via Tete) border between Mozambique and Malawi.
 From Mwanza M6 / M1 North takes on to Lilongwe.

Junctions

 Right at the end of Enterprise Road where A2 Road begins the A13 Highway to Shamva and through to Madziwa Mine branches left (north).
 Murehwa to Marondera (Juru-Marondera Road) 47 km.
 Murehwa T/off.  82 km from Harare. Murehwa-Nyadhire Road branches left to Murehwa about 2 km ahead,

•	Kotwa.

Waypoints

 Murehwa 82 km (the center is 2 km off-road to the right).
 Mutoko 56 km from Murehwa and 95 km before Nyamapanda border post.
 Kotwa: is the last waypoint nearer to Nyamapanda. It is just off the highway to the left. 
 Nyamapanda Town 238 km from Harare

See also

 ZINARA
 Transport in Zimbabwe
 Trans-African Highway network
 Beira-Lobito Corridor

References 

Roads in Zimbabwe